Maria Amalia may refer to:

 Maria Amalia of Courland (1653–1711), princess of Courland from the Ketteler family
 Maria Amalia of Nassau-Dillenburg (1582–1635), royal of the House of Nassau
 Maria Amalia of Naples and Sicily (1782–1866), Queen of the French from 1830 to 1848, consort to Louis-Philippe I
 Maria Amalia of Saxony (1724–1760), princess of Saxony, Queen Consort of Spain and Naples as wife of Charles III
 Maria Amalia, Duchess of Parma, (1746–1804), born Archduchess of Austria, by marriage Duchess of Parma, Piacenza and Guastalla
 Maria Amalia, Holy Roman Empress (1701–1756), born Archduchess of Austria, the daughter of Joseph I, Holy Roman Emperor, wife of Charles VII, Holy Roman Emperor
 Archduchess Maria Amalia of Austria (1780–1798), daughter of Emperor Leopold II

See also
 María Amalia Lacroze de Fortabat (1921–2012), Argentine executive and philanthropist
 Maria Amalia Mniszech (1736–1772), Polish-Saxon noblewoman and lady-in-waiting
 Maria Amália Vaz de Carvalho (1847–1921), Portuguese writer and poet
 Melina Mercouri (born Maria Amalia Mercouri, 1920–1994), Greek actress, singer, and politician